The Phare de la méditerranée is an observation tower with a revolving restaurant 45 metres above ground at Palavas-les-Flots in France. It was built in 1943 as a water tower.

See also 
 List of towers

External links 
 https://archive.today/20010303155840/http://www.palavaslesflots.com/fr/vacances/phare-medi.html
 http://www.skyscraperpage.com/cities/?buildingID=47688
 

Towers completed in 1943
Water supply infrastructure
Observation towers in France
Towers with revolving restaurants